The Jerry Rice Award is awarded annually in the United States to the most outstanding freshman player in the NCAA Division I Football Championship Subdivision (FCS) of college football as chosen by a nationwide panel of media and college sports information directors.

The trophy is named in honor of National Football League (NFL) hall of fame wide receiver Jerry Rice, who starred at Mississippi Valley State University.

Winners

References

College football national player awards
College sports freshman awards
NCAA Division I FCS football
Awards established in 2011